Adesmia muricata is a species of flowering plant in the legume family, Fabaceae. It was originally described in 1794 as Hedysarum muricatum Jacq.. It is native to Peru and Uruguay.

The following varieties are accepted:
Adesmia muricata var. muricata
Adesmia muricata var. affinis (Hook.f.) Burkart
Adesmia muricata var. dentata (Lag.) Benth.
Adesmia muricata var. gilliesii (Hook. & Arn.) Burkart
Adesmia muricata var. rionegrensis Burkart

References

muricata
Plants described in 1794
Flora of Peru
Flora of Uruguay